The General Mediterranean Holding (GMH) is a financial holding company established in 1979 in Luxembourg City, in southern Luxembourg, founded by Anglo-Iraqi businessman Nadhmi Auchi.

GMH is a diverse business group with activities in Banking & Finance, Real Estate & Construction, Hotel & Leisure, Industrial, Trading & Pharmaceuticals, Communications & IT and Aviation.

Its interests span across the Mediterranean and beyond with over 120 companies employing some 11,000 staff with representation in the Middle East, Northern Africa, Europe, the Americas, the Caribbean, the Asia Sub Continent and the Pacific Rim. The Group's consolidated assets now exceed €2 billion.

References

External links
 General Mediterranean Holdings official site

Investment companies of Luxembourg
Companies based in Luxembourg City
Holding companies established in 1979